Lotte is a 1928 German silent film directed by Carl Froelich and starring Henny Porten, Walter Jankuhn and Hermann Vallentin. Lotte, a young woman from an aristocratic background, masquerades as a poor person. Art direction was by Franz Schroedter.

Cast
 Henny Porten as Lotte - Tochter Süßkinds 
 Walter Jankuhn as Harald von Lindenberg 
 Hermann Vallentin as Burgkastellan Süßkind 
 Elsa Wagner as Anita Negrelli - Hofschauspielerin a.D. 
 Lotte Werkmeister as Amalie Süßkind - seine zweite Frau 
 Alexandra Schmitt as Frau Wehmut - Hebamme a.D. 
 Ralph Arthur Roberts as Möricke - Schlosser a.D. 
 Paul Passarge   
 Adele Sandrock

References

Bibliography
 Kreimeier, Klaus. The Ufa Story: A History of Germany's Greatest Film Company, 1918-1945. University of California Press, 1999.

External links

1928 films
Films of the Weimar Republic
German silent feature films
Films directed by Carl Froelich
German black-and-white films
UFA GmbH films